is a city located in Hiroshima Prefecture, Japan.

As of May 1, 2017, the city has an estimated population of 27,684, with 12,939 households, and a population density of 350 persons per km2. The total area is 78.57 km2.

History
 5th century - Okudano-sato - Okudano-eki on the San'yōdō.
 1608-1611 - Kamei-jyo.
 The city "Otake" was founded on September 1, 1954.

Geography

Climate
Ōtake has a humid subtropical climate (Köppen climate classification Cfa) characterized by cool to mild winters and hot, humid summers.

Demographics
Per Japanese census data, the population of Ōtake in 2020 is 26,319 people. Ōtake has been conducting censuses since 1950.

Economy
 Otake is the part of Seto Inland Sea industrial area, formed the first petrochemical industrial complex (kombinat) in Japan.
 Mitsui Chemicals, Mitsubishi Rayon

Transportation
 Hatsukaichi can be accessed from Hiroshima city via the JR West Sanyo Line.
 Sanyō Expressway connects Hiroshima and Iwakuni.
 Japan National Route 2, Route 186 (Japan)

Tourism
 Yasaka Dam Yasaka dam, Yasaka-kyo
 Kinryu Park Kinryu Park
 Kamei Park Kamei Park
 Jyaku0iwa Jyaku-iwa
 Atata Island Atata-jima
 Mount Mikura Mikura-dake
 Mount Mikura Campsite Mikura-dake campsite

Notable people
 Miyuki Ishimoto

Sister cities
Otake has Sister City relationships with:
  Dujiangyan City, China

See also

 Yasaka Dam

References

External links

 Ōtake City official website 
 Ōtake City official website 

Cities in Hiroshima Prefecture